Mikhail Skorulskyi (or Myhailo Skorulskyi; 1887–1950), was a Ukrainian composer. In 1936, he composed the score to Lisova Pisnya (The Forest Song), a three-act ballet based on the drama of the same name by Lesya Ukrainka. The ballet premiered in 1946.

References
http://members.quintessentially.com/newsletters/2011-07-04/article/38927
http://classical-music-online.net/en/composer/Skorulskyi/9365

Ukrainian composers
1887 births
1950 deaths
Musicians from Kyiv
People from Kiev Governorate
Burials at Baikove Cemetery